Weybourne may refer to:
Weybourne, Norfolk, Norfolk, England
Weybourne railway station, in Weybourne, Norfolk
RAF Weybourne, Norfolk
Weybourne Windmill, Norfolk
Weybourne, Surrey, Surrey, England